Marie-Hélène Lafon (born 1962) is a French educator and award-winning writer.

She was born in Aurillac in the Cantal department and grew up on the family farm there. She was educated at a religious boarding school in Saint-Flour and, after moving to Paris in 1980, continued her studies at the Sorbonne. She took her agrégation de grammaire in 1987, going on to  teach classical literature. Lafon only began writing when she was 34, publishing her first novel Le soir du chien in 2001.

Selected works 
 Le soir du chien, novel (2001), received the Prix Renaudot young adult
 Liturgie, stories (2002), received the Prix Renaissance de la Nouvelle
 Sur la photo, novel (2003)
 Mo : roman, novel (2005)
 Organes, stories (2006)
 La maison Santoire (2007)
 Les Derniers Indiens, novel (2008)
 L'annonce, novel (2009)
 Gordana, novel (2009)
 Les Pays, novel (2012), received the Globe de Cristal Award
 Album, alphabet book (2012)
 Tensions toniques - les récits de Marie-Hélène Lafon, stories (2012)
 Traversée (2013)
 Joseph (2014)
 Chantiers (2015)
 Histoires (2016), received the Prix Goncourt de la nouvelle
 Nos vies (2017)
 Histoire du fils (2020), received the Prix Renaudot

Legacy 
The university library of Letters, Languages ​​and Human Sciences of Clermont Auvergne University was renamed to her name in October 2021.

References

External links 
 

1962 births
Living people
French women novelists
Prix Goncourt de la nouvelle recipients
French educators
People from Aurillac
Prix Renaudot winners
Prix Renaudot des lycéens winners